Rajyalakshmi Chandu, better known by her stage name Sankarabharanam Rajyalakshmi (born 18 December 1964) is an Indian actress. She was a prominent lead actress during the 1980s in Telugu, Tamil, Kannada and Malayalam films. She was well noted for her performance in the Telugu movie Sankarabharanam in which she starred as the female lead alongside  Chandra Mohan at the age of fifteen. Since her success from Sankarabharanam, Rajyalakshmi has acted as a heroine with many prominent actors from all corners of the Indian film industry including N. T. Rama Rao, Nageswara Rao, Rajinikanth, Balakrishna, Shankar, Mohanlal, Dilip, Jeetendra, Mammooty and Vishnuvardhan.  Currently she is acting in Telugu and Tamil television shows with guest appearances in movies.

Family and personal life 

Rajyalakshmi was born in Tenali, Andhra Pradesh on 18 December 1964. As a child she acted in small plays with her mother as part of an acting troupe where she was eventually discovered. In 1980 she was cast to play "Sarada" in Sankarabharanam to which she received critical acclaim.

She was married in the year 1990 to K. R. Krishnan and they have two children, Rohit Krishnan and Rahul Krishnan. She now resides in Chennai with her family.

Filmography

Tamil 

 Sujatha (1980)
 Kodeeswaran Magal (1981)
 Moondru Mugam (1982)
 Adhisayappiravigal (1982)
 Archanai Pookal (1982)
 Garuda Saukiyama (1982)
 Nalanthana (1982)
 Bhagavathipuram Railway Gate (1983)
 Imaigal (1983)
 Kai Kodukkum Kai (1984)
 Nanayam Illatha Nanayam (1984)
 Sanga Natham (1984)
 Then Koodu (1984)
 Kadivalam (1985)
 Perumai (1985)
 Puthiya Theerpu (1985)
 Meendum Pallavi (1986)
 Manithanin Marupakkam (1986)
 Anandha Kanneer (1986)
 Thaaiku Oru Thaalaattu (1986)
 Pookkal Vidum Thudhu (1987)
 Poovizhi Vasalile (1987)
 Shankar Guru (1987)
 Soora Samhaaram (1988)
 Kaadhal Geetham (1988)
 Kai Veesamma Kai Veesu (1989)
 Dravidan (1989)
 En Arumai Manaivi (1989)
 Nyayangal Jeyikkattum (1990)
 Pudhu Padagan (1990)
 Thalattu Padava (1990)
 Parasuram (2003)
 Dreams (2004) 2003
 Priyasakhi (2005)
 Thirupaachi (2005)
 Varalaru (2006)
 Em Magan (2006)
 Thirupathi (2006)
 Mudhal Kanave (2007)
 Sadhu Miranda (2008)
 Dhanam (2008)
 Yaaradi Nee Mohini (2008)
 Pirivom Santhippom (2008)
 Kutty (2010)
 Uthamaputhiran (2010)
 Ariyaan (2012)
 Saivam (2014)
 Kaala Koothu (2018)
 Iruvar Ullam (2021)

Malayalam 

 Shylock  (2020) as Chinnamma
 Proprietors: Kammath & Kammath (2013) as Kammath's mother
 Puthumukhangal (2010) as Subhadra
 Chess (2006) as Vijayakrishnan's mother
 Police Diary (1992)
 Superstar (1990) as Kanchana
 Oru Vadakkan Veeragatha (1989) as Kuttimani
 Kaalalppada (1989) as Mercy Raveendranath
 Ithente Neethi (1987)
 Amrutham Gamaya (1987) as Sarada
 Aayiram Kannukal (1986) as Suzy
 Ilanjippookkal (1986)
 Vannu Kandu Keezhadakki (1985) as Sridevi
 Ivide Thudangunnu (1984) as Indu
 Ankam (1983) as Treasa
 Kodunkaattu (1983) as Jameela
 Ahankaaram (1983) as Radhika
 Pooviriyum Pulari (1982) as Nandhini
 Ahimsa (1982)
 Aakrosham (1982) as Nirmala
 Aarambham (1982) as Rasiya
 Thrishna (1981) as Sreedevi

Telugu 

 Sankarabharanam (1980) (Won National Award for Best Actress in Telugu)
 Rowdy Ramudu Konte Krishnudu (1980)
 Ammayi Mogudu Mamaku Yamudu (1980)
 Gopala Krishnudu (1982)
 Trishulam (1982)
 Justice Chowdary (1982) as Lata
 Nelavanka (1983)
 Abhilasha (1983)
 Neti Bharatam (1983)
 Adavallu Aligithe (1983)
 Rustum (1984)
 Janani Janmabhoomi (1984)
 Srimadvirat Veerabrahmendra Swami Charitra (1984)
 Rojulu Marayi (1984)
 Donga (1985)
 O Thandri Theerpu (1985)
 Driver Babu (1986) as Chandini
 Vikram (1986) as Seetha
 Ashtalakshmi Vaibhavamu (1986)
 Vijrumbhana (1986)
 Jayam Manade (1986) as Jyothi
 Aakrandana (1986)
 Chanakya Shapatham (1986)
 Kashmora (1986)
 Pasivadi Pranam (1987)
 Jaganmatha (1987)
 Madana Gopaludu (1987)
 Dharmapatni (1987)
 Aadadhe Aadharam (1987)
 Jhansi Rani (1988)
 Bharya Bharthalu (1988)
 Vivaha Bhojanambu (1988)
 Chinababu (1988)
 Abhinandana (1988)
 Thodallullu (1988)
 Samsaram (1988)
 Kaliyuga Karnudu (1988) as Seetha
 Paila Pacheesu (1989)
 Idem Pellam Baboi (1990)
 Anji (2004)
 Swarabhishekam (2004)
 Malliswari (2004)
 Athanokkade (2005)
 Premikulu (2005)
 Maa Iddari Madhya (2006)
 Aadavari Matalaku Arthale Verule (2007)
 Adhurs (2010)
 Parama Veera Chakra (2011)
 Naruda Donoruda (2016)
 Prati Roju Pandage(2020)
 Naandhi (2021)

Kannada 
 Koodi Baalidare Swarga Sukha (1979)
 Muniyana Madari (1981)
 Sahasa Simha (1982)
 Indina Bharatha (1984)
 Thayi Thande (1985)
 Usha (1986)
 Manavararu (1987)

Television series

References

External links 

Rajalakshmi at MSI

Indian film actresses
Actresses in Malayalam cinema
Actresses in Tamil cinema
Actresses in Kannada cinema
Actresses in Telugu cinema
Living people
1964 births
People from Tenali
Actresses from Andhra Pradesh
Indian television actresses
20th-century Indian actresses
21st-century Indian actresses
Actresses in Telugu television
Actresses in Tamil television